Battle of Tilpat 1669 fought between Jats and Mughals. The Mughal Emperor Aurangzeb took Haevy Tax to Farmers. And as a result Farmers rebelled against Mughals his leader Became Gokula zamindar of Tilpat. This Battle fought for 4 days. Gukula had support of 20,000 Jats

Aftermath
Gokula and his uncle Uday Singh Jat captured by Mughals and killed on 1 January 1670 near Agra Fort.

References

Battles involving the Jats
Battles of the Early Modern period